It's Not Love (But It's Not Bad) is the fifteenth studio album by American country singer Merle Haggard and The Strangers, released in 1972. It reached number one on the Billboard country albums chart. The lead off single was "It's Not Love (But it's Not Bad)" which also reached No. 1 on the charts.

Haggard's second studio album of 1972 contains several songs that display an ambivalence towards relationships, such as "Somewhere To Come When It Rains," "My Woman Keeps on Loving Her Man," the adulterous "I Wonder Where I'll Find You at Tonight," and the cynical title track.  The LP also contains the Haggard original "I Wonder What She'll Think About Me Leaving," which Conway Twitty took to number 4 in 1971.

Reception

AllMusic's Stephen Thomas Erlewine calls the album a "frustrating listen," and a "fitfully entertaining album, equally divided between the excellent and the mediocre. A few of the throwaways are entertaining, particularly the rolling 'New York City Blues,' but songs like 'Dad's Old Fiddle' and 'My Woman Keeps Lovin' Her Man' fail to make an impression." Music critic Robert Christgau wrote "This mainstream country album—his first since Hag—does more justice to its title than many of his more pretentious efforts. Nothing special, just marriage and its travails, but play it twice and you'll remember most of it."

Track listing
All songs by Merle Haggard unless otherwise noted:

"It's Not Love (But it's Not Bad)" (Hank Cochran, Glenn Martin)
 "Goodbye Comes Hard for Me" (Tommy Collins)
 "My Woman Keeps Lovin' Her Man"
 "New York City Blues"
 "I Wonder What She'll Think About Me Leaving"
 "The Conversion of Ronnie Jones" (Tommy Collins)
 "A Shoulder to Cry On"
 "I'd Never Told on You" (Cochran)
 "Dad's Old Fiddle" (Martin)
 "Somewhere to Come When It Rains" (Red Lane)
 "I Wonder Where I'll Find You at Tonight"

Personnel
Merle Haggard– vocals, guitar

The Strangers:
Roy Nichols – lead guitar
Norman Hamlet – steel guitar, dobro
Bobby Wayne - rhythm guitar, harmony vocals
Dennis Hromek – bass, background vocals
Biff Adam – drums

with
Red Lane – guitar
Johnny Gimble – fiddle

and
Ray Edenton – guitar
Glen D. Hardin – piano
Hargus "Pig" Robbins – piano
Billy Liebert – piano
Bill Woods – fiddle

Chart positions

References

1972 albums
Merle Haggard albums
Capitol Records albums
Albums produced by Ken Nelson (United States record producer)

Albums recorded at Capitol Studios